Emamzadeh District is a district (bakhsh) in Natanz County, Isfahan Province, Iran. At the 2006 census, its population was 23,211, in 5,994 families.  The District has two cities: Badrud and Khaledabad. The District has two rural districts (dehestan): Emamzadeh Aqaali Abbas Rural District and Khaledabad Rural District.

References 

Natanz County
Districts of Isfahan Province